Middlesbrough and Ironopolis Football and Athletic Club was a short lived football club based in the town of Middlesbrough, Yorkshire, England.

Middlesbrough Ironopolis Football Club formed as a split from Middlesbrough Football Club in 1889, and both teams made the move from amateur to professional football within a week of each other in December 1889. However, both teams came to realise their only real chance of gaining promotion to the Football League was through a reunion of the two teams. On 7 May 1892, after a meeting between the two clubs, an application to join the Football League was made under the name Middlesbrough and Ironopolis Football Club. The club received only one vote in its application, possible reasons being the long travelling distances and allegations of poaching of players from League teams. The club decided not to apply for membership of the Football League Second Division.

After failing to enter the League, and disagreements between the two original clubs on the make up and ground of the new club, the clubs reverted to playing individually.

Sources
 
 History of Middlesbrough FC

Middlesbrough F.C.
Association football clubs established in 1892
Association football clubs disestablished in 1892
Defunct football clubs in North Yorkshire
1892 establishments in England
1892 disestablishments in England